The 1993 Comcast U.S. Indoor was a men's tennis tournament played on indoor carpet courts that was part of the Championship Series of the 1993 ATP Tour. It was the 26th edition of the tournament and was played at the Spectrum in Philadelphia, Pennsylvania in the United States from February 15 to February 22, 1993. Unseeded Mark Woodforde won the singles title.

Finals

Singles

 Mark Woodforde defeated  Ivan Lendl 5–4 (Lendl retired)
 It was Woodforde's only singles title of the year and the 4th of his career.

Doubles

 Jim Grabb /  Richey Reneberg defeated  Marcos Ondruska /  Brad Pearce 6–7, 6–3, 6–0
 It was Grabb's only title of the year and the 16th of his career. It was Reneberg's 3rd title of the year and the 11th of his career.

References

External links
 ITF tournament edition details

Comcast U.S. Indoor
U.S. Pro Indoor
Comcast U.S. Indoor
Comcast U.S. Indoor
Comcast U.S. Indoor